Henri Kontinen and Jarkko Nieminen were the defending champions, but Nieminen chose not to participate this year. Kontinen played alongside Robin Haase but lost in the final to Nicolás Almagro and Carlos Berlocq 5–7, 6–3, [11–9].

Seeds

Draw

Draw

References
 Main Draw

Generali Open Kitzbuhel - Doubles
2014 Doubles